Crosshill  and Codnor railway station was a railway station which served the villages of Crosshill and Codnor in Derbyshire, England It was opened in 1890 by the Midland Railway  on its branch between Langley Mill  on the Erewash Valley Line and Ripley

History
The line came into being as competition for the GNR's branch. It was completed as far as Heanor by 1890, but took another five years to reach Langley Mill .

The station was built at line level next an overbridge carrying the Ripley to Heanor road. It was reached by a short driveway and a flight of wooden steps. There was only one platform. There were no goods facilities. The station was located on Station Lane just down from St James' Church.

Initially there were four trains each way between Heanor and Ripley and Butterley, with five on Saturday, but no Sunday service. When the line opened to Langley Mill this increased to nine each way.

Having  been built for colliery traffic and passengers were an incidental, so only a shuttle was considered necessary. However, some trains ran between Nottingham and Ambergate or Chesterfield. One particularly complex service ran from Nottingham through Basford and Kimberley to Ilkeston Town, then via Langley Mill to Ripley and Butterley to Chesterfield.

Services ended during the First World War, but the line reopened in 1920. In the Grouping of all lines into four main companies in 1923 the station  became part of the London, Midland and Scottish Railway . From 1914 the line had been in competition with the Ripley Rattlers a tramcar service opened by the Nottinghamshire and Derbyshire Tramways Company. To reduce costs a Sentinel Steam Railcar was introduced in 1925, but the line finally closed to passengers with the General Strike the following year.

By 1928 rails had been lifted to the south of  the station and at the end of December 1929 the decision was taken to remove all track between Ripley and Heanor. The station buildings were used for various purposes until 1972 when they were demolished. The road had been straightened and the bridge filled in during 1955.

References

Disused railway stations in Derbyshire
Former Midland Railway stations
Railway stations in Great Britain opened in 1890
Railway stations in Great Britain closed in 1917
Railway stations in Great Britain opened in 1920
Railway stations in Great Britain closed in 1926